Prof. Moshe Revach (Hebrew: מֹשֶה רֶוָח) is a chairman of Israel's National Trauma Board, Member Board of Directors of Maccabi Sherutei Briut (healthcare services), Assuta Hospitals, Be'telem Organization and the nonprofit Society of Public Hospitals which owns SAREL Supplies & Services for Medicine Ltd.  Prof. Revach was formerly a director of the Rambam Medical Center, a commander of the Israeli Medical Corps and an associate professor at the Military Medicine, Faculty of Medicine, Technion-Israel Institute of Technology, Haifa.

References

Israeli military doctors
Academic staff of Technion – Israel Institute of Technology

he:משה רווח